Porandra  is a genus of mainly perennial plants in the family Commelinaceae, first described in 1974. It is native to China and Indochina.

 Species
 Porandra microphylla Y.Wan - Guangxi
 Porandra ramosa D.Y.Hong - Thailand, Guangxi, Guizhou, Yunnan
 Porandra scandens D.Y.Hong - Yunnan, Laos, Thailand, Vietnam

References

Commelinaceae
Commelinales genera